The Fordham Urban Law Journal is a student-run law review published at Fordham University School of Law. The journal publishes articles on a wide range of themes, with a focus on public policy and issues affecting urban areas.

Overview
The journal was established in 1972 and publishes five to six issues annually. It is the fifth-most cited student-edited specialty law journal in the United States and the seventh-most cited in judicial opinions. It is the second-most cited student-edited publication for public policy.  Second-year law students apply for staff positions by participating in the school's unified writing competition. Editors are elected annually in the spring semester. The current editor-in-chief is Shazell Archer.

Notable articles 
Articles cited by the Supreme Court of the United States:
Douglas E. Abrams, The Scope of Liability Under Section 12 of the Securities Act of 1933: "Participation" and the Pertinent Legislative Materials, Fordham Urb. L.J. 15:877 (1987).
Ty Alper, Anesthetizing the Public Conscience: Lethal Injection and Animal Euthanasia, Fordham Urb. L.J. 35:817 (2008).
Irma B. Ascher, Comment, Restrictions on Access to the Federal Courts in Civil Rights Actions: The Role of Abstention and Res Judicata, Fordham Urb. L.J. 6:481 (1978).
Rory K. Little, The Federal Death Penalty: History and Some Thoughts About the Department of Justice's Role,  Fordham Urb. L.J. 26:347 (1999).
Mark Malone, Homelessness in a Modern Urban Setting, Fordham Urb. L.J. 10:749 (1982).

Most-cited articles.  
Bruce A. Green, Why Should Prosecutors "Seek Justice"?, Fordham Urb. L.J. 26:607 (1999)
Rory K. Little, The Federal Death Penalty: History and Some Thoughts About the Department of Justice's Role, Fordham Urb. L.J. 26:347 (1999)
Keith Aoki, Race, Space, and Place: the Relation Between Architectural Modernism, Post-Modernism, Urban Planning, and Gentrification, Fordham Urb. L.J. 20:699 (1993)
Lucy A. Williams, Race, Rat Bites and Unfit Mothers: How Media Discourse Informs Welfare Legislation Debate, Fordham Urb. L.J. 22:1159 (1995)
Gerald Torres, Environmental Burdens and Democratic Justice, Fordham Urb. L.J. 21:431 (1994)

Most-cited recent articles. 
Craig Gurian, A Return to Eyes on the Prize: Litigating Under the Restored New York City Human Rights Law, Fordham Urb. L.J. 33:255 (2006)
Kimberlee K. Kovach, New Wine Requires New Wineskins: Transforming Lawyer Ethics for Effective Representation in a Non-Adversarial Approach to Problem Solving: Mediation, Fordham Urb. L.J. 28:935 (2001)
Colin Gordon, Blighting the Way: Urban Renewal, Economic Development, and the Elusive Definition of Blight, Fordham Urb. L.J. 31:305 (2004)

Events
The journal hosts the annual Cooper-Walsh Colloquium and an annual symposium to discuss issues relevant to public policy and legal discourse. Select symposium and colloquium submissions are published. Recent publications have focused on a diverse range of legal issues, including immigration, forensic evidence, the subprime mortgage crisis, and the use of eminent domain in New York City.

The journal also hosts various student and alumni events, awarding its Louis J. Lefkowitz award at an annual alumni banquet. In addition to presenting the Lefkowitz Award, the Alumni Association honors the incoming and outgoing editors of the Urban Law Journal, and announces the winners of its Urban Law Alumni Fellowship (a fellowship awarded to a student who has accepted a public interest summer position and demonstrated a commitment to the improvement of our urban communities) and the Student Author/Note Award (awarded to a student who has authored the most outstanding note in the preceding school year).

Louis J. Lefkowitz Award
Each year the Fordham Law School Urban Law Journal Alumni Association (FULJAA) gives the Lefkowitz Award to a person who has made outstanding contributions to the law as it affects urban communities. The award is given in the spirit of Louis J. Lefkowitz, who served as New York Attorney General for almost twenty-two years (1957 through 1978).

References

External links 

American law journals
Urban Law
General law journals
Publications established in 1972
English-language journals
Law journals edited by students
Urban studies and planning journals
1972 establishments in New York City
5 times per year journals
Fordham University School of Law